The 2021 National League 2, also known as the 2021 MPT Myanmar National League 2, is the 9th season of the MNL-2, the second division league for association football clubs since its founding in 2012.

It has been decided to hold the MNL2 tournament with a total of eight teams, including Dagon FC and a new team that have re-applied for MNL2.

New Clubs 
Dagon registered to play again in 2021 MNL-2 season.

Clubs

Stadiums

References

External links
 2021 Myanmar National League

MNL-2 seasons
2021 in Burmese football